The Atlantic flashlightfish (Kryptophanaron alfredi) is a species of flashlight fish native to the western Atlantic Ocean. This species grows to a length of  TL. This species is the only known member of its genus and can be found in the aquarium trade.

Kryptophanaron alfredi has a special organ near its mouth that is specially adapted for the growth of luminescent bacteria (Photobacterium). Enough light is generated from millions of bacteria that the fish can navigate over coral reefs at night and attract prey to their light. The light organ has a membrane that descends like an eyelid to control the amount of light emitted.  {Robert W Bauman, Microbiology with diseases and taxonomy fourth edition page 141}

Distribution
K. alfredi has a wide range in the western Atlantic Ocean and Caribbean Sea and can be found around numerous islands, including the Bahamas, the Cayman Islands, Jamaica, Navassa Island, Puerto Rico, the Virgin Islands, Honduran Bay Islands, and Curacao.

Conservation
Although not much is known about the population of K. alfredi due to its deep-water habitat and nocturnal behavior, it is listed as "Least Concern" by the IUCN because of its large range and lack of major threats.

References

Atlantic flashlightfish
Fish of the Caribbean
Monotypic marine fish genera
Taxa named by Henry Weed Fowler